An Ideal Husband is a 1999 British film based on the 1895 play An Ideal Husband by Oscar Wilde. The film stars Cate Blanchett, Minnie Driver, Rupert Everett, Julianne Moore and Jeremy Northam. It was directed by Oliver Parker.

It was selected as the 1999 Cannes Film Festival's closing film.

Premise
Sir Robert Chiltern is a successful government minister, well-off and with a loving wife. All this is threatened when Mrs. Cheveley appears in London with damning evidence of a past misdeed. Sir Robert turns to his friend Lord Goring for help, an apparently idle philanderer and the despair of his father. Goring knows the lady of old and the plot to help his friend has unintended consequences.

Cast

Differences from play 
The plot of the film differs from the original Wilde play in a number of key respects. The episode of Mrs. Cheveley's lost bracelet was removed, and the twists at the end are made more complex by the introduction of a bet between Lord Goring and Mrs Cheveley, and Lord Goring's need to ask the permission of Sir Robert Chiltern to marry his sister, Miss Mabel Chiltern.

Reception
The film received positive reviews from critics, including Roger Ebert, who awarded it 3 out of 4 stars. Owen Gleiberman of Entertainment Weekly wrote the film is "an enjoyable, minor, lustrously shot revamping of Oscar Wilde’s play about the perpetually interlocked manners of love and deception…Everett gets all the good lines, but he’s daring enough to deliver them gently, with a knowing touch of rue."

Stephen Holden of The New York Times also reviewed the film positively, writing, "If An Ideal Husband transports us back to a world that seems more refined than ours, it also flatters us, as Wilde flattered the play's fin de siècle audience, by arriving at a plain-as-the-nose-on-your-face piece of wisdom that after all the preceding badinage may seem more profound than it really is. Hollywood couldn't come up with a tidier feel-good ending -- one that gets everybody off the hook -- than An Ideal Husbands concluding moral: Nobody's perfect."

On Rotten Tomatoes, An Ideal Husband has an approval rating of 85% based on 67 critics’ reviews. The site’s critics consensus reads, " Brevity is the soul of wit, eh? This adaptation gets to the nitty gritty of Wilde's stage piece and plays on eternal human foibles."

Awards
Julianne Moore was nominated for the Chicago Film Critics Award for Best Supporting Actress, a Golden Globe Award for Best Actress in a Comedy or Musical, and a Golden Satellite Award for Best Actress in a Comedy or Musical. Moore won the National Board of Review Award for Best Supporting Actress for her performances in Magnolia, A Map of The World, and An Ideal Husband.

Everett received a Golden Globe nomination for Best Actor – Motion Picture Musical or Comedy.

The film was nominated for BAFTA awards in three categories: Oliver Parker for Best Adapted Screenplay, Caroline Harris for Best Costume Design, and Peter King for Best Make-up and Hair.

References

External links

1999 comedy films
British comedy films
British films based on plays
Films based on works by Oscar Wilde
Films directed by Oliver Parker
Films produced by Bruce Davey
Icon Productions films
Films set in London
1990s English-language films
1990s British films